Capriana (Caoriana in local dialect) is a comune (municipality) in Trentino in the northern Italian region Trentino-Alto Adige/Südtirol, located about  northeast of Trento.

Capriana borders the following municipalities: Montan, Truden, Altrei, Salorno, Valfloriana, Altavalle, and Sover.

Capriana is the birthplace of the mystic and Servant of God Maria Domenica Lazzeri.

References

Cities and towns in Trentino-Alto Adige/Südtirol